Coleophora thulea is a moth of the family Coleophoridae. It is found in Fennoscandia and northern Russia.

The wingspan is 11–14 mm. Adults are on wing in June and July.

The larvae feed on the leaves of Rubus chamaemorus.

References

thulea
Moths of Europe
Moths described in 1967